Trax is a shooter game for Nintendo's Game Boy developed by HAL Laboratory and published by HAL Laboratory in Japan and Electro Brain in other regions. It was released on January 8, 1991, in Japan and released in September 1991 overseas.

References

HAL Laboratory games
1991 video games
Game Boy games
Game Boy-only games
Electro Brain games
Run and gun games
Tank simulation video games
Video games developed in Japan